The fictional superheroes Superman and Batman have appeared together in a number of works:

 The Batman/Superman Hour, animated series that lasted from 1968 to 1969
 The Superman/Batman Adventures, 1995 television series
 The New Batman/Superman Adventures, 1997 television series
 World's Finest, 2004 fan film
 Superman and Batman versus Aliens and Predator, two-part comic series from 2007
 Superman/Batman, comic series that lasted from 2003 to 2011
 Superman/Batman: Public Enemies, 2009 direct-to-video film based on the comic series
 Superman/Batman: Apocalypse, 2010 direct to video sequel based on the comic series
 Batman v Superman: Dawn of Justice, 2016 film directed by Zack Snyder